The 2nd Hanoi International Film Festival opened on November 25 and closed on November 29, 2012 at Hanoi Friendship Cultural Palace, with the slogan "Asia-Pacific cinema unites and develops" (Vietnamese: "Điện ảnh châu Á - Thái Bình Dương thống nhất và phát triển").

A total of 117 films from 31 countries and regions attended the festival after going through the selection round. The number of films participating in the contest was 37, including: 14 feature-length films, 13 short films, five short documentaries and five animated films.

Programs
Main program of activities of the 2nd Hanoi International Film Festival:

Ceremonies - At Hanoi Friendship Cultural Palace, 91 Trần Hưng Đạo Street, Hoàn Kiếm District:
 Opening ceremony: 20:00-21:00, Sunday, November 25 (live broadcast on VTV2, VTV4)
 Opening screening: 21:00-22:30, Conference Room
 Closing ceremony: 20:00-22:00, Thursday, November 29 (live broadcast on VTV2, VTV4)

Professional Activities - At Hanoi Daewoo Hotel, 360 Kim Mã Street, Ba Đình District:
 Photo Exhibition: Cinema of Vietnam in Renovation Period (Vietnamese: "Điện ảnh Việt Nam thời kỳ đổi mới"), opening 11:00, Sunday, November 25
 The HANIFF Campus for Young Talents, opening 9:00, Monday, November 26. This is an activity held for the first time in Vietnam within the framework of the Film Festival, with activities included as follows:
 HANIFF Studio (training about 10 directors on how to make films, dialogue, casting and acting in front of the camera)
 HANIFF project market (create opportunities for young filmmakers and producers to present and introduce their projects in front of experienced co-producers and investors)
 HANIFF Forum of Script Idea Exchange (training and practice, for young screenwriters to compose scripts, develop characters, dialogue, discuss scripts with top screenwriters world).
 Seminar Cinema of Vietnam in Renovation Period (Vietnamese: "Điện ảnh Việt Nam thời kỳ đổi mới"), 14:00-16:00, Monday, November 26
 Seminar Cinema developing trend in digital technology (Vietnamese: "Xu hướng phát triển điện ảnh trong thời kỳ công nghệ số"), 9:00 - 12:00, Wednesday, November 28

Themed night events
 "Asia – Korea" Night: 19:00, Monday, November 26, at Hanoi Daewoo Hotel, 360 Kim Mã Street, Ba Đình District
 Europe Night and HANIFF Campus: 19:00, Wednesday, November 28, at Lý Club – 61 Lý Thái Tổ Street, Hoàn Kiếm District

Sightseeing Activities:
 Visiting Hạ Long Bay, all day, November 27
 Sightseeing Vietnamese Ethnology Museum, No. 01 Nguyễn Văn Huyên Street, Cầu Giấy District, 14:00, Wednesday, November 28

Movie screenings in theaters and exchange program of artists with the audience:
 Showtimes: 9:00 - 23:00, November 24 to 29
 The organizers expected that all films attending Haniff 2012 will be screened at 8 cinemas, but until the last days, receiving enthusiastic response, there was one more theater cluster participating in the screening including:
 National Cinema Center, 87 Láng Hạ Street, Ba Đình District 
 Megastar Cineplex, 6th floor, Hanoi Vincom Building, 191 Bà Triệu Street, Hai Bà Trưng District
 Megastar Cineplex, 5th floor, Pico Mall Center, 229 Tây Sơn Street, Đống Đa District
 August Cinema Theater, 45 Hàng Bài Street, Hoàn Kiếm District
 Kim Đồng Cinema Theater, 19 Hàng Bài Street, Hoàn Kiếm District
 Lotte Cinema, 5th-6th floor, Parkson Landmark 72, Keangnam Tower, Phạm Hùng Road, Từ Liêm District
 Lotte Cinema, 4th floor, Melinh Plaza, Hà Đông District
 Ngọc Khánh Theater, 365 Kim Mã Street, Ba Đình District
 Đại Đồng Theater, Hoàng Hoa Thám Street, Hà Đông District
 According to the festival's organizers, 70% of the seats of all screenings are sold to audience. Vietnamese films, documentaries, short films and films sponsored by international funds will be screened for free, while all foreign feature films will be sold at the price equal to 50% of the ticket price applied to each movie theater.

Juries and mentors

Juries
There are three jury panels established for this film festival:

Feature film:
 Jan Schütte , director, Director of the Berlin Film School - Chairman
 Cliff Curtis , actor, producer of Whenua Films
 Taraneh Alidoosti , actress
 Garin Nugroho , director
 Như Quỳnh , actress, People's Artist

Short film:
 Nguyễn Vinh Sơn , director - Chairman
 Martin Delisle , cinematographer, screenwriter, preliminary member of the Montreal International Short Film Festival
 Chalida Uabumrungjit , writer, film researcher, Director of Thai Short Film and Video Festival

Network for Promotion of Asian Cinema (NETPAC):
 Ashley Ratna Vibhushana , Managing Director of NETPAC - Chairman
 Phạm Nhuệ Giang , director
 Martine Thérouanne , the President of Vesoul International Film Festival of Asian Cinema

Mentors for the HANIFF Campus
The following people joined in teaching and mentoring for The HANIFF Campus:
 Michael Toshiyuki Uno , director
 Michael J. Werner , Co-Chairman of Fortissimo Films
 Frank S. Rittman , Asia-Pacific regional vice president for the Motion Picture Association (MPA)
 Sonja Heinen , Managing Director of European Film Promotion (EFP)
 Maren Niemeyer , journalist, author, documentary filmmaker
 Tessa Inkelaar , Development Producer at Film London
 Kang Je-gyu , director
 Dean Wilson , film researcher, consultant and lecturer at the Vietnam Cinema Project sponsored by the Ford Foundation
 Boo Junfeng , director

Official Selection—In Competition

Feature Film
These 14 films were selected to compete for the official awards in Feature Film category:

Highlighted title indicates Best Feature Film Award winner.

Short film
The following films were selected to compete for official awards in Short Film category:

Short:
Green Slime / 녹색물질 (12′) 
Hanger / Yi jia (13′) 
Monday, Wednesday, Friday / Hai, Tư, Sáu (17′) 
Solo (10′) 
Sony, My Elder Brother (10′) 
Starting From A / Bermula Dari A (16′) 
Swamp (14′) 
Switch (10′) 
The Reunion Dinner / 回家过年 (16′) 
The Three Sisters / 三朵花 (15′) 
To Truong Luong / Gửi Trương Lương (20′) 
Untitled Manila (5′) 
Whakatiki (13′) 

Documentary:
Behind the Life / Đằng sau sự sống (30′) 
God, Church, Pills & Condoms (28′)  
Northeast Wind Is Back / Gió chướng lại về (20′) 
The Story of Then Village / Chuyện làng Then (30′) 
Two Girls Against The Rain (11′) 

Animated:
Peaceful Space / Khoảng trời... (10′) 
Planet Z (10′) 
Steps (2′) 
The Piping of Heaven (11′)  
The Way Up (11′) 
Yellow Cow / Bò vàng (10′) 

Highlighted title indicates Best Short Film Award winner.

Official Selection—Out of Competition
These films were selected for out-of-competition programs:

Opening
 Hot Sand / Cát nóng – Lê Hoàng

Panorama: World Cinema

 A Separation / جدایی نادر از سیمین – Asghar Farhadi 
 Amour – Michael Haneke  
 At the Horizon / ປາຍທາງ – Anysay Keola 
 Bunohan – Dain Iskandar Said 
 Fly Me to the Moon / Un plan parfait – Pascal Chaumeil 
 Footnote / הערת שוליים – Joseph Cedar 
 Gangoobai – Priya Krishnaswamy 
 Maddened By His Absence / J'enrage de son absence – Sandrine Bonnaire 
 Mindfulness and Murder / ศพไม่เงียบ – Tom Waller 
 Something in the Air / Après mai – Olivier Assayas 
 The Chef / Comme un chef – Daniel Cohen 
  / Das Lied in mir –  
 The Iron Lady – Phyllida Lloyd  
 The Orator / O Le Tulafale – Tusi Tamasese  
 The Orphan of Kazan / Сирота казанская – Vladimir Mashkov  
 We Need to Talk About Kevin – Lynne Ramsay  
 Brother Number One – Annie Goldson, Peter Gilbert  (Documentary)
 The Land Beneath The Fog – Shalahuddin Siregar  (Documentary)

There are 10 short Japanese animated films combined into one screening session called "Japanese animation collection" with a total duration of 90 minutes.

Representing the Feature Film Jury
Because this year's feature film jury are famous directors and actors from different cinematic backgrounds, the organizers chose 5 films to represent 5 judges. The film Ngọc Viễn Đông was first chosen for Contemporary Vietnamese Film Program but then moved to this program.
  / Auf Wiedersehen Amerika – Jan Schütte directed 
 Soegija – Garin Nugroho directed 
 Modest Reception / پذیرایی ساده‎ – Mani Haghighi , starring Taraneh Alidoosti
 Whale Rider – Niki Caro , starring Cliff Curtis
 Pearls of the Far East / Ngọc Viễn Đông – Cường Ngô , starring Như Quỳnh

Country-in-Focus: South Korea 
The Korean Cinema Focus Program at HANIFF 2012 includes 10 films as follows:

 Late Autumn / 만추 – Kim Tae-yong (2010)
 Dancing Queen / 댄싱퀸 – Lee Seok-hoon (2012)
 Sector 7 / 7광구 – Kim Ji-hoon (2011)
 Silenced / 도가니 – Hwang Dong-hyuk (2011)
 Gingko Bed / 은행나무 침대 – Kang Je-gyu (1996)
 My Way / 마이 웨이 – Kang Je-gyu (2011)
 Howling / 하울링 – Yoo Ha (2012)
 Deranged / 연가시 – Park Jung-woo (2012)
 A Werewolf Boy / 늑대소년 – Jo Sung-hee (2012)
 Eungyo / 은교 – Jung Ji-woo (2012)

World Cinema Fund's Selection
The Berlin World Cinema Fund's Film Program introduces 5 outstanding films selected and supported in screening fee by the Fund:
 Bi, Don't Be Afraid / Bi, đừng sợ! – Phan Đăng Di 
 Death for Sale / موت للبيع – Faouzi Bensaïdi 
 Silent Light – Carlos Reygadas   
 The Prize / El premio – Paula Markovitch 
 Uncle Boonmee Who Can Recall His Past Lives / ลุงบุญมีระลึกชาติ – Apichatpong Weerasethakul

Cinema of Vietnam 
In order to provide an overview of Vietnamese cinema, at this film festival, the organizers selected 31 Vietnamese films, divided into 3 themes, for screening:

About Hanoi

 Chiếc chìa khóa vàng / The Golden Key – Lê Hoàng (2001)
 Em bé Hà Nội / Girl from Hanoi – Hải Ninh (1974)
 Hà Nội 12 ngày đêm / Hanoi: 12 Days and Nights – Bùi Đình Hạc (2002)
 Hà Nội mùa đông năm 46 / Hanoi Winter 1946 – Đặng Nhật Minh (1997)
 Khát vọng Thăng Long / The Prince and the Pagoda Boy – Lưu Trọng Ninh (2010)
 Ngọn đèn trong mơ / The Light in the Dream – Đỗ Minh Tuấn (1987)
 Truyện cổ tích cho tuổi mười bảy / Fairytale for 17-Year-Olds – Xuân Sơn (1988)

In Renovation Period

 Ai xuôi vạn lý / The Long Journey – Lê Hoàng (1996)
 Canh bạc / The Gamble – Lưu Trọng Ninh (1991)
 Chung cư / The Building – Việt Linh (1999)
 Cú và chim se sẻ / Owl and the Sparrow – Stephane Gauger (2007)
 Đời cát / Sandy Lives – Nguyễn Thanh Vân (1999)
 Gái nhảy / Bar Girls – Lê Hoàng (2002)
 Lưới trời / Heaven's Net – Phi Tiến Sơn (2003)
 Hãy tha thứ cho em / Please Forgive Me – Lưu Trọng Ninh (1993) 
 Mùa ổi / The Guava House – Đặng Nhật Minh (2000)
 Những người thợ xẻ / The Sawyers – Vương Đức (1999)
 Thằng Bờm / Bờm the Fool – Lê Đức Tiến (1987)
 Thung lũng hoang vắng / The Deserted Valley – Phạm Nhuệ Giang (2001)
 Thị trấn yên tĩnh / The Quiet Town – Lê Đức Tiến (1986)
 Thương nhớ đồng quê / Nostalgia for Countryland – Đặng Nhật Minh (1995)
 Vị đắng tình yêu / The Bitterness of Love – Lê Xuân Hoàng (1990)
 Xương rồng đen / Black Cactus – Lê Dân (1993)

Contemporary (2010–2012)

 Chạm / Touch – Nguyễn Đức Minh (2011)
 Dành cho tháng Sáu / Of Us and June – Nguyễn Hữu Tuấn (2012)
 Đó… hay đây? / Here… or There? – Síu Phạm (2011)
 Lời nguyền huyết ngải / Blood Curse – Bùi Thạc Chuyên (2012)
 Mùi cỏ cháy / The Scent of Burning Grass – Hữu Mười (2012)
 Sài Gòn Yo! / Saigon Electric – Stephane Gauger (2011)
 Tâm hồn mẹ / Mother's Soul – Phạm Nhuệ Giang (2011)
 Scandal: Bí mật thảm đỏ / Scandal – Victor Vu (2012)

Awards
All of official and independent awards of 2012 HANIFF were awarded at the closing ceremony of the festival, on the evening of November 29:

In Competition—Feature film
 Best Feature Film: Shackled 
 Special Jury Prize for Feature Film: Blood Letter 
 Best Director: Reis Çelik – Night of Silence , Iskandar Usmonov – The Telegram 
 Best Leading Actor: Ilyas Salman – Night of Silence 
 Best Leading Actress: Ying Yaning – Song of Silence

In Competition—Short film
 Best Short Film: Starting From A – B.W. Purba Negara 
 Special Jury Prize for Short Film: Yellow Cow – Trần Khánh Duyên 
 Best Young Director of a Short Film: Yonezawa Mina – Solo

NETPAC Award
 NETPAC's Award for Asian Cinema Promotion: Shackled

The HANIFF Campus
 Best Young Talent Award of Motion Picture Association - Asia Pacific region: Nguyễn Hoàng Điệp 
 Talented Screenwriter Award of HANIFF Mentors: Đỗ Minh Tú 
 Talented Producer Award of HANIFF Mentors: Nguyễn Vũ Đức

References

External links
 

2012 film festivals
Hanoi International Film Festival
2012 in Vietnam
2012 in Vietnamese cinema